László Szentgróthy (born 11 October 1891, date of death unknown) was a Hungarian swimmer. He competed in two events at the 1912 Summer Olympics.

References

External links
 

1891 births
Year of death missing
Hungarian male swimmers
Olympic swimmers of Hungary
Swimmers at the 1912 Summer Olympics
People from Esztergom
Sportspeople from Komárom-Esztergom County